Gusman Sittykovich Kosanov (25 May 1935 – 19 July 1990) was a Soviet and Kazakh sprinter. He competed for the Soviet Union at the 1960 and 1964 Olympics, in the individual 100 m and 4×100 m relay. He failed to reach the individual finals, but won a silver medal in the relay in 1960, becoming the first ethnic Kazakh athlete to win an Olympic medal.

Kosanov took up athletics in 1951. He won the Soviet title in the 4×100 m relay in 1960 and placed second in 1964; in the individual 100 m he finished second in 1966 and third in 1963. He retired in 1967 to work as an athletics coach in Kazakhstan. Kosanov hung himself in July 1990 after he was diagnosed with diabetes and fired from his job as a director of a sports school in Alma-Ata. After his death, an annual athletic meet has been held in Almaty in his honor.

References

1935 births
1990 deaths
1990 suicides
People from East Kazakhstan Region
Armed Forces sports society athletes
Athletes (track and field) at the 1960 Summer Olympics
Athletes (track and field) at the 1964 Summer Olympics
Medalists at the 1960 Summer Olympics
Olympic athletes of the Soviet Union
Olympic silver medalists for the Soviet Union
Olympic silver medalists in athletics (track and field)
Honoured Masters of Sport of the USSR
Recipients of the Order of the Red Banner of Labour
Kazakhstani male sprinters
Soviet male sprinters
Suicides by hanging in Kazakhstan
Suicides by hanging in the Soviet Union